Don't Look Now was a British television programme which aired in 1950 on the BBC. It starred Alfred Marks. All six episodes are missing, believed lost. They aired live, and while the ability to record live television was developed in late 1947, the BBC rarely used the technology until around 1953, as it was considered of unacceptable quality by the BBC prior to that.

References

External links
Don't Look Now on IMDb

1950s British television series
1950 British television series debuts
1950 British television series endings
Lost BBC episodes
BBC Television shows
Black-and-white British television shows
British live television series